Eukaryotic translation initiation factor 4E, also known as eIF4E, is a protein that in humans is encoded by the EIF4E gene.

Structure and function 
Most eukaryotic cellular mRNAs are blocked at their 5'-ends with the 7-methyl-guanosine five-prime cap structure, m7GpppX (where X is any nucleotide). This structure is involved in several cellular processes including enhanced translational efficiency, splicing, mRNA stability, and RNA nuclear export. eIF4E is a eukaryotic translation initiation factor involved in directing ribosomes to the cap structure of mRNAs. It is a 24-kD polypeptide that exists as both a free form and as part of the eIF4F pre-initiation complex. Almost all cellular mRNA require eIF4E in order to be translated into protein. The eIF4E polypeptide is the rate-limiting component of the eukaryotic translation apparatus and is involved in the mRNA-ribosome binding step of eukaryotic protein synthesis.

The other subunits of eIF4F are a 47-kD polypeptide, termed eIF4A, that possesses ATPase and RNA helicase activities, and a 220-kD scaffolding polypeptide, eIF4G.

Some viruses cut eIF4G in such a way that the eIF4E binding site is removed and the virus is able to translate its proteins without eIF4E. Also some cellular proteins, the most notable being heat shock proteins, do not require eIF4E in order to be translated. Both viruses and cellular proteins achieve this through an internal ribosome entry site in the RNA.

Regulation 
Since eIF4E is an initiation factor that is relatively low in abundance, eIF4E is a potential target for transcriptional control. Regulation of eIF4E may be achieved via three distinct mechanisms: transcription, phosphorylation, and inhibitory proteins.

a.   Regulation of eIF4E by Gene Expression

The mechanisms responsible for eIF4E transcriptional regulation are not entirely understood. However, several reports suggest a correlation between myc levels and eIF4E mRNA levels during the cell cycle. The basis of this relationship was further established by the characterization of two myc-binding sites (CACGTG E box repeats) in the promoter region of the eIF4E gene. This sequence motif is shared with other in vivo targets for myc and mutations in the E box repeats of eIF4E inactivated the promoter region, thereby diminishing its expression.

b.   Regulation of eIF4E by Phosphorylation

Stimuli such as hormones, growth factors, and mitogens that promote cell proliferation also enhance translation rates by phosphorylating eIF4E. Although eIF4E phosphorylation and translation rates are not always correlated, consistent patterns of eIF4E phosphorylation are observed throughout the cell cycle; wherein low phosphorylation is seen during G0 and M phase and wherein high phosphorylation is seen during G1 and S phase. This evidence is further supported by the crystal structure of eIF4E which suggests that phosphorylation on serine residue 209 may increase the affinity of eIF4E for capped mRNA.

c.   Regulation of eIF4E by Inhibitory Proteins

Assembly of the eIF4F complex is inhibited by proteins known as eIF4E-binding proteins (4E-BPs), which are small heat-stable proteins that block cap-dependent translation. Non-phosphorylated 4E-BPs interact strongly with eIF4E thereby preventing translation; whereas phosphorylated 4E-BPs bind weakly to eIF4E and thus do not interfere with the process of translation. Furthermore, binding of the 4E-BPs inhibits phosphorylation of Ser209 on eIF4E.

The Role of eIF4E in Cancer 
The role of eIF4E in cancer was established after Lazaris-Karatzas et al. made the discovery that overexpressing eIF4E causes tumorigenic transformation of fibroblasts. Since this initial observation, numerous groups have recapitulated these results in different cell lines. As a result, eIF4E activity is implicated in several cancers including cancers of the breast, lung, and prostate. In fact, transcriptional profiling of metastatic human tumors has revealed a distinct metabolic signature wherein eIF4E is known to be consistently up-regulated.

FMRP represses translation through EIF4E binding 

Fragile X mental retardation protein (FMR1) acts to regulate translation of specific mRNAs through its binding of eIF4E. FMRP acts by binding CYFIP1, which directly binds eIF4e at a domain that is structurally similar to those found in 4E-BPs including EIF4EBP3, EIF4EBP1, and EIF4EBP2. The FMRP/CYFIP1 complex binds in such a way as to prevent the eIF4E-eIF4G interaction, which is necessary for translation to occur. The FMRP/CYFIP1/eIF4E interaction is strengthened by the presence of mRNA(s). In particular, BC1 RNA allows for an optimal interaction between FMRP and CYFIP1. RNA-BC1 is a non-translatable, dendritic mRNA, which binds FMRP to allow for its association with a specific target mRNA. BC1 may function to regulate FMRP and mRNA interactions at synapse(s) through its recruitment of FMRP to the appropriate mRNA.

In addition, FMRP may recruit CYFIP1 to specific mRNAs in order to repress translation. The FMRP-CYFIP1 translational inhibitor is regulated by stimulation of neuron(s). Increased synaptic stimulation resulted in the dissociation of eIF4E and CYFIP1, allowing for the initiation of translation.

Interactions 
EIF4E has been shown to interact with:

 EIF4A1, 
 EIF4EBP1, 
 EIF4EBP2, 
 EIF4EBP3, 
 EIF4ENIF1,
 EIF4G1, and
 EIF4G2.

See also 
 Eukaryotic initiation factors
 Eukaryotic initiation factor 4F (eIF4F)

References

Further reading

External links 
 Cap-dependent translation initiation from Nature Reviews Microbiology. A good image and overview of the function of initiation factors.